AdVantage News is a daily (online) and weekly (print) hyper-local American newspaper, published in Alton, Illinois, and serving the Metro East region of Illinois. Established as a pennysaver in 1986, the publication transitioned into a newspaper in February 2014.

In 1986, Jim Seibold and Sharon McRoy formed Today's AdVantage, a pennysaver that was mailed to 42,000 households in the Riverbend area.

In 2013, Alton-based lawyer and owner of Alton Steel John Simmons purchased Today's AdVantage from Seibold and McRoy with the intention of turning it into a newspaper.

On Feb. 1, 2014, Today's AdVantage became AdVantage News.

References

Newspapers published in Illinois
Alton, Illinois